John Howard Lundrigan (January 10, 1939 – March 5, 2009) was a Canadian politician, who represented the electoral district of Gander—Twillingate in the House of Commons of Canada from 1968 to 1974. He was a member of the Progressive Conservative caucus.

In his parliamentary career, Lundrigan is best remembered for having been on the receiving end of Prime Minister Pierre Trudeau's famous "fuddle duddle" comment of 1971.

In the 1974 election, Lundrigan ran in the district of Bonavista—Trinity—Conception, but was defeated by that riding's incumbent MP, Dave Rooney.

He was later elected to the Newfoundland House of Assembly for the electoral district of Grand Falls-Buchans, serving as a cabinet minister in the government of Frank Moores. He was a pallbearer at Moores' funeral in 2005.

Lundrigan died on March 5, 2009.

References

External links
 

1939 births
2009 deaths
Members of the House of Commons of Canada from Newfoundland and Labrador
Progressive Conservative Party of Canada MPs
Progressive Conservative Party of Newfoundland and Labrador MHAs